Italy competed at the FIS Alpine World Ski Championships 1933 in Innsbruck, Austria, from 6 to 10 February 1933.

Medalists
At this third edition of the world championships, Italy won no medal.

Results

Men

Women

See also
 Italy at the FIS Alpine World Ski Championships
 Italy national alpine ski team

References

External links
 Italian Winter Sports Federation 

Nations at the FIS Alpine World Ski Championships 1933
Alpine World Ski Championships
Italy at the FIS Alpine World Ski Championships